Callistus is a genus of ground beetle in the subfamily Licininae.

References

External links 
 
 

Licininae
Carabidae genera
Taxa named by Franco Andrea Bonelli